The following lists events that happened during 2009 in the Democratic Republic of São Tomé and Príncipe.

Incumbents
President: Fradique de Menezes
Prime Minister: Joaquim Rafael Branco

Events

References

 
Years of the 21st century in São Tomé and Príncipe
2000s in São Tomé and Príncipe
São Tomé and Príncipe
São Tomé and Príncipe